Jabal Nahran is a mountain of the Sarwat Mountain Range in the region of Asir Belkrb, Saudi Arabia. It is near the city of Abha and at a height of  it is the ninth-highest peak in the Saudi kingdom.

References

Nahran